Yeh Raat Phir Na Aayegi is a 1992 Indian Hindi-language horror thriller film, produced by Zakir-Shabbir on Zakir Hussain Films banner and directed by Nusrat Sayeed. Starring Jeetendra, Meenakshi Sheshadri and music composed by Rajesh Roshan.

Plot 
The film begins at a ruin where a beautiful girl Roopa welcomes her love every night with a song. One night, Thakur Jaswant Kumar molests and kills her. Here is a thunderbolt, the next night he hears the same song and also the movements of Roopa. Immediately, he rushes to where he is slain and everyone believes that bloodthirsty Roopa's soul committed the crime. Hence, a stout-hearted CBI Officer Sunil Verma is appointed to break out the mystery. During his investigation, he finds that Thakur is surrounded by many enemies. Shyamlal is a creditor whom he deceived. Ranjeet Singh is his manager and is disgraced. Jagannath is a servant, as Thakur lusts his daughter etc. Then, Sunil gets startled to see his love interest Radha as a dancer in a hotel. Nevertheless, he seeks her support. Meanwhile, Thakur‘s younger brother Vijay returns from abroad and avenges the homicide. Moreover, signals of the soul are haunted every night leaving bloodshed of Shyamlal, Jagannath and another servant Gulabo, but fortuitously Vijay is rescued by Sunil. One night, Sunil combats with a person in a veil and grabs his locket which holds Roopa's picture. Surprisingly, he detects the woman wandering as a ghost is Radha when she affirms that somebody has abducted her infant brother and extorted her. After taking several twists & turns Sunil uncovers the convict as Shyamlal, the beau of Roopa has made this master plan. Initially, he eliminated Thakur out of vengeance which Jagannath & Gulabo aided him. Later, he falsified by announcing his death and also terminated Jagannath & Gulabo too. At last, Sunil ceases Shyamlal and Radha is acquitted with a short-term penalty for assisting him. Finally, the movie ends on a happy note with the union of Sunil & Radha.

Cast 
 Jeetendra as Sunil Malhotra 
 Meenakshi Sheshadri as Radha 
 Aruna Irani as Lajwanti
 Sujit Kumar as Jagannath
 Sadashiv Amrapurkar as Thakur Jaswant Kumar
 Vijayendra Ghatge as Shyamlal
 Laxmikant Berde as Gilli
 Anil Dhawan as Ranjeet Singh
 Mac Mohan as Rajan
 Abid as Vijay
 Sharmilee as Vijay's Girlfriend
 Neelam Mehra as Gulabo
 Alpana Goswami as Roopa
 Kishore Bhanushali as Receptionist

Soundtrack
Lyrics: Ibrahim Ashq, Raj Tilak, Payam Sayeedi.

References 

1990s Hindi-language films
Films scored by Rajesh Roshan
1990s horror thriller films
Indian horror thriller films
1992 horror films
1992 films